Wallis Walter Lefeaux (September 19, 1881 – November 24, 1972) was an English-born merchant, lawyer and political figure in British Columbia. He represented Vancouver Centre in the Legislative Assembly of British Columbia from 1941 to 1945 as a Co-operative Commonwealth Federation (CCF) member.

He was born in London in 1881, of Huguenot descent, and worked as a bookkeeper and travelling salesman before coming to Canada at the age of 20. Lefeaux worked as a fur trader before becoming a clothing retailer. He was also involved in real estate. He served as an alderman in Revelstoke. Lefeaux was also president of the Socialist Party of Canada. He ran unsuccessfully as a Socialist candidate provincially in 1907, 1912 and 1916, as a Labour candidate for the Canadian House of Commons in 1925 and 1926 and as a CCF candidate for the Vancouver Centre provincial seat in 1933 before being elected to the provincial assembly in 1941. Lefeaux was defeated when he ran for reelection to the assembly in 1945 and 1949. He died in West Vancouver at the age of 90.

In 1921, he published A study of bolshevism.

References

External links
 

1881 births
1972 deaths
Politicians from London
British Columbia Co-operative Commonwealth Federation MLAs
20th-century Canadian politicians
English emigrants to Canada